Yolanda Hopkins Sequeira (born 2 June 1998), known as Yolanda Hopkins or Yolanda Sequeira, is a Portuguese professional surfer. At club level she represents Clube Naval de Portimão.

Early life 
Hopkins was born to a Portuguese father and Welsh mother. She developed an interest in surfing at the age of eight.

Career 
Hopkins bagged the Best Wave Award at the 2019 Portugal Surf Awards and also won the Tiago Pires award in the same year.

She claimed second position at the 2021 ISA World Surfing Games which qualified her for the 2020 Summer Olympics, the first Olympic games to include surfing as a sport.

She represented Portugal at the 2020 Summer Olympics which also marked her debut appearance at the Olympics. She qualified for the quarterfinals of the women's shortboard event. After making it to the quarterfinals, she was defeated by Bianca Buitendag of South Africa.

References 

1998 births
Living people
People from Faro, Portugal
World Surf League surfers
Surfers at the 2020 Summer Olympics
Olympic surfers of Portugal
Portuguese people of British descent
Portuguese female surfers
Sportspeople from Faro District